The Rapid City Public Library is the system of public libraries in Rapid City, South Dakota, United States. It is located at 610 Quincy Street. The library offers services at no charge for residents of Pennington County.

History
Library services were first offered in Rapid City beginning in 1879, when a volunteer reading room was organized by community women with $45, donated books and periodicals, and a free subscription to the Minneapolis Journal. In an 1881 charter by the territorial government, the Rapid City Library Association built Library Hall on the corner of 6th and Kansas City Streets on donated land. In 1915, the city began building a Carnegie library building located on the corner of Kansas City and 6th streets in downtown Rapid City, and in 1917 the library collection moved there. The collection eventually outgrew the space, and in 1972 a new building was opened at 610 Quincy Street.

In 2002, the library added an expansion to house the juvenile and young adult collections, as well as to provide a service lobby, drive-through window and covered parking space.

In 2008, the Rapid City Public Library opened its first satellite location at 10 Van Buren Street as part of the new General Beadle School Community Center, housing a public elementary school and community hall. In 2020, this location closed as part of a mutual agreement between Rapid City Area Schools and Rapid City Public Library.

Main location

The library has a collection of over 147,000 materials as well as thousands of digital resources, subscriptions to over 40 newspapers and magazines, and 53 public-use computers. Both locations offer free Wi-Fi access.

In 2008, the main library was named by Nancy Pearl in USA Today as one of "10 Great Places to Find a Nook and Read a Book".

The Historical Collections Room contains resources and archives related to Rapid City and the Black Hills area. Included in this collection are oral histories, television broadcasts and photographs of the 1972 Black Hills Flood, rare books focusing on Black Hills history, scrapbooks related to Rapid City mayors and city issues, and miscellaneous collections on a wide spectrum of local history subjects.

Local history resources also include online digital collections, such as the Black Hills Knowledge Network of local information; the Rapid City Oral History Project; and thousands of images and documents related to Rapid City and the Black Hills.

References

External links
 RCPL Main Page
 Rapid City Public Library's Carnegie Building, hosted on the RCPL Flickr site

Education in Rapid City, South Dakota
Public libraries in South Dakota
Buildings and structures in Rapid City, South Dakota